Cyperus tenuiculmis is a species of sedge that is endemic to tropical parts of central Africa, north eastern Australia and south east Asia.

The species was first formally described by the botanist Johann Otto Boeckeler in 1870.

See also 
 List of Cyperus species

References 

tenuiculmis
Taxa named by Johann Otto Boeckeler
Plants described in 1870
Flora of Zimbabwe
Flora of Zambia
Flora of the Democratic Republic of the Congo
Flora of Uganda
Flora of Togo
Flora of Tanzania
Flora of Angola
Flora of Benin
Flora of Botswana
Flora of the Republic of the Congo
Flora of the Central African Republic
Flora of Burundi
Flora of Cameroon
Flora of the Northern Territory
Flora of Queensland
Flora of Cambodia
Flora of China
Flora of India
Flora of Nepal
Flora of the Philippines
Flora of Myanmar
Flora of Vietnam
Flora of Thailand
Flora of Sri Lanka
Flora of Taiwan